Nathaniel McClinic (April 26, 1924 – April 3, 2004) was an American Negro league outfielder for the Cleveland Buckeyes between 1946 and 1948.

A native of Silver Creek, Georgia, McClinic served in the US Army during World War II. He played three seasons for the Buckeyes, including their 1947 Negro American League championship club. After his baseball career, McClinic served as a police officer in Floyd County, Georgia. He died in Rome, Georgia in 2004 at age 79.

References

External links
 and Seamheads
 Nathaniel McClinic at Negro Leagues Baseball Museum

1924 births
2004 deaths
Cleveland Buckeyes players
People from Floyd County, Georgia
Baseball players from Georgia (U.S. state)
Baseball outfielders
United States Army personnel of World War II
20th-century African-American sportspeople
21st-century African-American people